Google Pay (also known as GPay) is a mobile payments application developed by Google. It has been rolled out in India, Singapore, and the United States.

History 

On November 18, 2020, Google launched a companion app in the United States. It functions as an expansion of the Singaporean and Indian versions of the app, the company announced the Google Wallet companion app during the 2022 Google I/O keynote, which replaced the 2018 Google Pay app while co-existing with the 2020 one after it was launched on July 18, 2022.

Country availability

See also
Tez (software)

References

External links 
 

Android (operating system) software
Computer-related introductions in 2020
Pay (mobile app)
Mobile payments
Online payments